Ututu Hirka (Quechua ututu a small viper, Ancash Quechua hirka mountain, "ututu mountain", also spelled Ututo Irca) is a mountain in the Cordillera Negra in the Andes of Peru which reaches a height of approximately . It lies in the Ancash Region, Huarmey Province, on the border of the districts of Huayan and Malvas. Ututu Hirka lies southeast of Pillaka.

References

Mountains of Peru
Mountains of Ancash Region